Robert Jordan was an American author known for writing the fantasy novel series The Wheel of Time. His works also include several Conan the Barbarian novels, and non-fantasy fiction such as The Fallon Saga.

Fantasy fiction

The Wheel of Time

Jordan published 11 books of a total 14 in the main sequence of the Wheel of Time series. Reviewers and fans of the earlier books noted a slowing of the pace of events in the last few installments owing to the expansion of scale of the series as a whole.

Because of his health problems, Jordan did not work at full force on the final installment A Memory of Light (later split into three volumes beginning with The Gathering Storm), but blog entries confirmed that he continued work on it until his death, and he shared all of the significant plot details with his family not long before he died. He maintained that in doing so the book will get published even if "the worst actually happens." On December 7, 2007, Tor Books announced that Brandon Sanderson had been chosen to finish the Wheel of Time series. Harriet McDougal, Jordan's widow, chose him after reading Mistborn: The Final Empire.

The Wheel of Time series consists of:

In addition to the main sequence, Robert Jordan also wrote some accessory works:
The World of Robert Jordan's The Wheel of Time (November 6, 1997, reference book, written in collaboration with Teresa Patterson)
This reference book includes "The Strike at Shayol Ghul", a short story published online in 1996 which was republished in print as part of this reference book
New Spring (October 1998, novella, published in Tor's Legends anthology, edited by Robert Silverberg; the story is located in the third volume of the paperback edition; the hardcover is one volume)
New Spring (January 2004, novel, an expanded work superseding the earlier novella)
From the Two Rivers, a repackaging of the first half of The Eye of the World for a younger market, includes an additional prologue titled Ravens.
To the Blight, a repackaging of the second half of The Eye of the World for a younger market.
The Hunt Begins, a repackaging of the first half of The Great Hunt for a younger market.
New Threads in the Pattern, a repackaging of the second half of The Great Hunt for a younger market.

In 2010, with full permission of the Jordan estate, writer Chuck Dixon began adapting The Eye of the World into a comic books series published by Dynamite Entertainment. The individual comic books were later collected in volumes and released by Tor Books. Notable illustrators who have worked on the series include Chase Conley, Marcio Fiorito, Francis Nuguit, and others.
Eye of the World: The Graphic Novel, Volume One, 2011
Eye of the World: The Graphic Novel, Volume Two, 2012
Eye of the World: The Graphic Novel, Volume Three, 2013
Eye of the World: The Graphic Novel, Volume Four, 2013
Eye of the World: The Graphic Novel, Volume Five, 2014
Eye of the World: The Graphic Novel, Volume Six, 2016

The World of Robert Jordan's The Wheel of Time is an encyclopedia for the series about the unnamed world where the plot takes place, which is often referred by fans of the series as the World of the Wheel. It is published in the United States by Tor Books and in the United Kingdom by Orbit Books. The bulk of the text was written by Teresa Patterson based on notes and information provided by Jordan, who also serving as overall editor on the project. While the information in the guide is broadly canonical, the book is deliberately written with vague, biased or even downright false (or guessed) information in places, as Patterson felt this would reflect a key theme of the series (the mutability of knowledge across time and distance).

Conan the Barbarian

Jordan was one of several writers who have written new Conan the Barbarian stories. When Tom Doherty obtained the rights, he needed a novel very quickly, so Jordan's wife Harriet McDougal recommended him because she knew he had written his first novel, Warriors of the Altaii, in thirteen days.

So he thought I could write something fast, and he was right, and I liked it. It was fun writing something completely over the top, full of purple prose, and in a weak moment I agreed to do five more and the novelization of the second Conan movie. I've decided that those things were very good discipline for me. I had to work with a character and a world that had already been created and yet find a way to say something new about the character and the world. That was a very good exercise.

Jordan wrote seven novels in the series:

Conan the Invincible (1982)
Conan the Defender (1982)
Conan the Unconquered (1983)
Conan the Triumphant (1983)
Conan the Magnificent (1984)
Conan the Destroyer (1984)
Conan the Victorious (1984)
Some bibliographies also include Conan: King of Thieves; this was actually the working title of the second Conan movie, and hence also the title of Jordan's novelization. Jordan had already been hired to do the novelization and Tor had already applied for an ISBN when the title was changed to Conan the Destroyer.

They were packed into two separate volumes:
The Conan Chronicles
The Further Chronicles of Conan (The Conan Chronicles II in the UK, different contents)

Jordan also compiled a well-known Conan Chronology.

Warrior of the Altaii

Warrior of the Altaii is Jordan's first novel, which remained unpublished for more than 40 years; it is 98,000 words in length, and he finished it in 13 days. Donald A. Wolheim at DAW Books made an offer for it, but revoked the offer when Jordan requested a small change in his contract. When Harriet McDougal was Editorial Director for Ace Books, Tom Doherty hired Jim Baen to work under her. When Doherty left Ace Books to start Tor Books in 1980, Baen followed, working at Tor for a few years before starting his own imprint, Baen Books. Baen did not have a very high opinion of fantasy, and so he bought Warrior for Ace Books as a science fiction novel. When he left Ace for Tor, Susan Allison took his place and reverted the rights for the novel to Jordan. When McDougal returned to Charleston to start her own imprint, Popham Press, she met Jordan and published his first novel, The Fallon Blood. Twelve years after his death, Warrior of the Altaii was published on October 8, 2019.

Non-fantasy fiction

Cheyenne Raiders
Cheyenne Raiders (1982) is a western published under the pen name Jackson O'Reilly, for the Forge imprint of Tor Books.

The Fallon Saga
The Fallon Blood (1980), published under the pen name Reagan O'Neal, was Jordan's second novel and first published novel. It was edited and published by Jordan's future wife, Harriet McDougal, for her personal imprint, Popham Press. After they finished promoting the book on tour, they began dating, and when Jordan asked McDougal to marry him, he began selling his books directly to Tom Doherty at Tor Books. The following two books, The Fallon Pride (1981) and The Fallon Legacy (1982) were published under Tor's Forge imprint. Jordan originally planned to take the series much further:

Unpublished works

Infinity of Heaven
Jordan mentioned several times that he planned another fantasy series, titled Infinity of Heaven, set in a different kind of world. He said that it would be a Shōgun-esque series about a man in his 30s who is shipwrecked in an unknown culture, which would be similar to Seanchan culture in his Wheel of Time series and world. The books would detail his adventures there.

He said that he would have begun writing these after finishing his work on the 12th and final main sequence book of The Wheel of Time. Jordan said, "Infinity of Heaven almost certainly will be written before the prequels, though I might do them between the Infinity books." Also according to Dragonmount.com, Jordan planned to write some side-story novels, before completely abandoning his decades-long work. Jordan had particularly stressed that this series would be significantly shorter than The Wheel of Time saga (about six books long and essentially two trilogies).

References

Bibliographies by writer
Bibliographies of American writers
Fantasy bibliographies